A constitutional referendum was held in Gabon and Moyen Congo on 13 October 1946 as part of the wider French constitutional referendum. Although the proposed new constitution was rejected by 72% of voters in the territory, it was approved by 53% of voters overall.

Results

See also 

 French Fourth Republic
 Provisional Government of the French Republic

References

1946 referendums
October 1946 events in Africa
1946
1946 in Gabon
1946
1946 in Moyen-Congo
1946
Constitutional referendums in France
1946 elections in France